Ruberti is a surname. Notable people with the surname include:

Antonio Ruberti (1927–2000), Italian politician and engineer
Enrico Ruberti (1914–1985), Italian rower
Paolo Ruberti (born 1975), Italian racing driver

See also
Rubert